"Still Doin' Time" is a song written by John Moffatt and Michael P. Heeney, and recorded by American country music artist George Jones.  It was released in September 1981 as the first single from the album Still the Same Ole Me.  The song was Jones' eighth number one country single as a solo artist.  The single stayed at number one for one week and spent a total of ten weeks on the chart.  Much like his previous hit single, "If Drinkin' Don't Kill Me (Her Memory Will)," the song seemed torn from the pages of the singer's life; drug-addled and paranoid, he often disappeared for weeks on end, missing show dates and confounding his managers. "Still Doin' Time," with its story of a man who is a prisoner of alcohol who cannot escape, rang true to critics and fans, many of whom were astonished at how effectively Jones could sing despite his condition. Professionally, he was thriving; in November 1982 CBS Records extended his recording contract, and in December, he was nominated in the Playboy readers' poll as the year's best male vocalist in the country and Western category.

Charts

References
 

George Jones songs
1981 singles
Song recordings produced by Billy Sherrill
Epic Records singles
Songs written by Michael P. Heeney
1981 songs